The Kinderhook plates are a set of six small, bell-shaped pieces of brass with unusual engravings, created as a hoax in 1843, surreptitiously buried and then dug up at an Indian mound near Kinderhook, Illinois.

The plates were forged by three men from Kinderhook as a prank on the local Latter Day Saint community. According to Latter Day Saint belief, the Book of Mormon is a record of the ancient Judeo-Semitic inhabitants of the Americas, originally translated by the founder of the movement, Joseph Smith, from golden plates engraved in the language of reformed Egyptian. Latter Day Saint residents of Kinderhook sent the plates to Smith in Nauvoo for translation, where Smith said they were of ancient origin and translated a portion of them.

In 1980, scientific testing confirmed the hoax, and that the plates were a modern creation. Within the Latter Day Saint movement, Smith's translation was never accepted in the canon of scripture, but was generally considered authentic.

Background
Latter Day Saints had been expelled from Missouri in the late 1830s, and settled in and around modern day Nauvoo, Illinois. By 1842, there was a congregation of around 100 members a couple miles south of the village of Kinderhook.  Two residents of Kinderhook, a farmer named Wilburn Fugate and a merchant named Robert Wiley, were proselytized by missionaries using the Parley P. Pratt missionary tract A Voice of Warning, that used the phrase, "Truth would spring up out of the earth".  Fugate and Wiley decided to "prove the prophecy by way of a joke", and enlisted the help of village postmaster and blacksmith Bridge Whitton to create a set of six small plates of brass. In an 1879 letter to James T. Cobb, Fugate wrote of their creation:

"Bridge Whitton cut them (the plates) out of some pieces of copper; Wiley and I made the hieroglyphics by making impressions on beeswax and filling them with acid and putting it on the plates. When they were finished we put them together with rust made of nitric acid, old iron and lead, and bound them with a piece of hoop iron, covering them completely with rust."

The purpose in creating the hoax has been debated. It is frequently presented as being a trap for Joseph Smith, to expose his translating abilities. Local recollections indicate that the creators of the hoax never expected the plates to be delivered to Smith for translation, but more of a community prank. Fugate himself stated the purpose was, "simply for a joke" on the local community of Latter Day Saints, and one of his sons said that rather than being an elaborate trap for Smith, it was "a little plan by which to startle the natives."

Purported discovery

On April 16, 1843, Wiley began to dig a deep shaft in the center of an Indian mound near the village. It was reported in the Quincy Whig that the reason for Wiley's sudden interest in archaeology was that he had dreamed for three nights in a row that there was treasure buried beneath the mound. At first, he undertook the excavation alone, and reached a depth of about ten feet (3 m) before he abandoned the work, finding it too laborious an undertaking. On April 23, he returned with a group of ten or twelve companions to assist him. They soon reached a bed of limestone, apparently charred by fire. Another two feet (60 cm) down, they discovered human bones, also charred, and "six plates of brass of a bell shape, each having a hole near the small end, and a ring through them all, and clasped with two clasps". A member of the excavation team, W. P. Harris, took the plates home, washed them, and treated them with sulphuric acid. Once they were clean, they were found to be covered in strange characters resembling hieroglyphics.

The plates were briefly exhibited in the city, and then sent on to Joseph Smith, the founder of the nascent Latter Day Saint movement. Smith had previously said that on September 22, 1823, an angel led him to a set of buried golden plates written in reformed Egyptian, from which he said he translated the Book of Mormon. The finders of the Kinderhook plates and the general public were keen to know if Smith would be able to decipher the symbols on the Kinderhook plates as well. The Times and Seasons, a Latter-Day Saint publication, claimed that the existence of the Kinderhook plates lent further credibility to the authenticity of the Book of Mormon. Parley Pratt wrote that the plates contained Egyptian engravings and "the genealogy of one of the ancient Jaredites back to Ham the son of Noah."

Smith's response
Smith's private secretary, William Clayton, recorded that upon receiving the plates, Smith sent for his "Hebrew Bible & Lexicon", suggesting that he was going to attempt to translate the plates by conventional means, rather than by use of a seer stone or direct revelation. On 1 May, Clayton wrote in his journal:

Joseph Smith planned to translate the plates in their entirety.  The editors of the Nauvoo Neighbor (apostles John Taylor and Wilford Woodruff), promised in a June 1843 article that "The contents of the plates, together with a Fac-simile of the same, will be published in the 'Times and Seasons,' as soon as the translation is completed."

The History of the Church also states Smith said the following:

Stanley B. Kimball says the statement found in History of the Church could have been an altered version of William Clayton's statement, placing Smith in the first person. Diane Wirth, writing in Review of Books on the Book of Mormon (2:210), states: "A first-person narrative was apparently a common practice of this time period when a biographical work was being compiled. Since such words were never penned by the Prophet, they cannot be uncritically accepted as his words or his opinion".

Connection with the Grammar and Alphabet of the Egyptian Language
A number of translation documents were created in 1835 in connection with the translation of the Book of Abraham, one of which is called the Grammar and Alphabet of the Egyptian Language (GAEL).  There is evidence that this document was used in deciphering the Kinderhook Plates.  In a May 7, 1843 letter to a friend, apostle Parley P. Pratt wrote, "A large number of Citizens have seen them and compared the characters with those on the Egyptian papyrus which is now in this city."  A sympathetic letter also dated May 7, 1843, published in the New York Herald for May 30, 1843, presents further evidence:

The plates are evidently brass, and are covered on both sides with hyerogliphics. They were brought up and shown to Joseph Smith. He compared them, in my presence, with his Egyptian Alphabet…and they are evidently the same characters. He therefore will be able to decipher them ... You may expect something very remarkable pretty soon.

A prominent character from one of the plates matches well with a character in the Grammar and Alphabet of the Egyptian Language (GAEL), and the translation of that character in the GAEL compares with the description given by William Clayton.

Rediscovery, analysis, and classification as a hoax
The Kinderhook plates were presumed lost, but for decades the Church of Jesus Christ of Latter-day Saints (LDS Church) published facsimiles of them in its official History of the Church. In 1920, one of the plates came into the possession of the Chicago Historical Society (now the Chicago History Museum). In 1966, this remaining plate was tested at Brigham Young University. The inscriptions matched facsimiles of the plate published contemporaneously, but the question remained whether this was an original Kinderhook plate, or a later copy.

Though there was little evidence of whether the Kinderhook Plates were ancient or a contemporary fabrication, some within the LDS Church believed them to be genuine. The September 1962 Improvement Era, an official magazine of the church, ran an article by Welby W. Ricks stating that the Kinderhook plates were genuine.  In 1979, apostle Mark E. Petersen wrote a book called Those Gold Plates!. In the first chapter, Peterson describes various ancient cultures that have written records on metal plates. Then Peterson claims: "There are the Kinderhook plates, too, found in America and now in the possession of the Chicago Historical Society. Controversy has surrounded these plates and their engravings, but most experts agree they are of ancient vintage."

In 1980, Professor D. Lynn Johnson of the Department of Materials Science and Engineering at Northwestern University examined the remaining plate. He used microscopy and various scanning devices and determined that the tolerances and composition of its metal proved entirely consistent with the facilities available in a 19th-century blacksmith's shop and, more importantly, found traces of nitrogen in what were clearly nitric acid-etched grooves.

In addition, Johnson discovered evidence that this particular plate was among those examined by early Mormons, including Smith, and not a later copy. One of the features of the plate was the presence of small dents in the surface caused by a hexagonally-shaped tool. Johnson noticed that one of these dents had inadvertently been interpreted in the facsimile as a stroke in one of the characters. If the plate owned by the Chicago Historical Society had been a copy made from the facsimiles in History of the Church, that stroke in that character would have been etched, like the rest of the characters. He concluded that this plate was one that Smith examined, that it was not of ancient origin, and that it was in fact etched with acid, not engraved, confirming Fugate's 1879 description.

In 1981, the official magazine of the LDS Church ran an article stating that the plates were a hoax, and asserted that there was no proof that Smith made any attempt to translate the plates under the direction of God, in the way he had with the Book of Mormon: "There is no evidence that the Prophet Joseph Smith ever took up the matter with the Lord, as he did when working with the Book of Mormon and the Book of Abraham".

See also

The Greek Psalter Incident 
List of plates (Latter Day Saint movement)
 Voree plates

Notes

Further reading
  [Held in the library collections of Brigham Young University and the University of Utah.]

Joseph Smith
1843 archaeological discoveries
1843 works
1843 in Christianity
1843 in Illinois
19th-century hoaxes
19th-century inscriptions
Archaeological forgeries
History of the Latter Day Saint movement
Hoaxes in the United States
Latter Day Saint movement in Illinois
Mormonism-related controversies
Religious hoaxes
Brass sculptures